Cinema Company is a 2012 Malayalam-language romantic comedy drama film written and directed by Mamas, and starring mainly newcomers. Basil, Sanjeev M Nair, Shruthi Hariharan and Badri play the roles of four close friends who dream of making a film.

Plot
As Paul Cheriyan prepares to leave for his office, he sees several people coming into his building. He asks a watchman about it, and learns that a boy has died in an accident, to which his friends bore witness. Paul goes to where the dead boy's friends are mourning and cursing themselves, and then returns to his apartment, where he starts thinking about his own friends and where they might be now.

He recalls Parvathi, also called Paru, who carried a Ukulele with her and sang jingles on air, then Varghese Panikkar, a rich friend of his who wanted to be a director and always carried a sketch pad and a camera. He next thinks about Fazal, also called Ikka, a writer who received many awards for his books. He was in love with a rich girl named Roshni. Paul then reflects on his own former dream to be an actor. The four friends had intended to make a film together, but things did not work out and the project was abandoned.

Paul returns to Kochi, the place where he and his friends had tried and failed to make their film. He is reunited with his friends and they finally make the movie of their dreams, which then becomes a huge success.

Cast
 Basil as Paul Cheriyan
 Sanjeev M Nair as Varghese Panikkar
 Shruthi Hariharan as Parvathi, aka Paru
 Badri as Fazal, aka Ikka
 Sanam Shetty as Deepika
 Lakshmi Devy as Roshni, Fazal's girlfriend
 Kottayam Nazeer as Sayippu, a production controller
 Lalu Alex as Roshni's father
 T. P. Madhavan as Military uncle
 Baburaj as Sabu, a movie-loving thug
 Shibla as Fasna
 Swasika as Reena
Krishna as Johnny, a media-man and Reena's life partner
 Nithin as Rajeev, an actor
 Narayanankutty as the autodriver
 Unni Sivapal as the film director
 Biju Paravoor as a friend of the Cinema Company
 Ambika Mohan as Paul's mother

Soundtrack
The soundtrack of the film was composed by Alphons Joseph, with lyrics penned by Rafeeq Ahammed, Santhosh Varma and Jagmeet Bal.

References

External links
 
 

2010s Malayalam-language films
2012 romantic comedy-drama films
Films scored by Alphons Joseph
Indian romantic comedy-drama films
Films about films
2012 films
2012 comedy films
2012 drama films